In Hollywood with Potash and Perlmutter is a 1924 American silent comedy film, produced by Samuel Goldwyn, released through Associated First National Pictures, and directed by Alfred E. Green.

A sequel of sorts, the Jewish ethnic comedy characters of Potash and Perlmutter return from their 1923 debut film, also produced by Goldwyn, but with a different actor for Potash. The films were based on Potash and Perlmutter a play by Charles Klein and Montague Glass which opened on Broadway in 1913 and ran for 441 performances. This sequel also adapted the play Business Before Pleasure by  Montague Glass and Jules Eckert Goodman which opened in 1917 for 357 performances.

Alexander Carr returned for his role as Perlmutter but his longtime partner from the Broadway plays and the 1923 movie, Barney Bernard, died in March 1924, before this film got underway. Bernard was only 45 but always looked considerably older than he was. George Sidney, soon to be famous in another Jewish series The Cohens & the Kellys, picks up the part of Potash where Barney Bernard left off.

They would return again in 1926 in Partners Again (1926).  Goldwyn had evidently been familiar with this series of Jewish-themed stories, written by Montague Glass and mounted as a Broadway play in 1913, back when he was a glove salesman, and produced these film versions over the objections of the other Jewish moguls of Hollywood.

Cast 
 Alexander Carr as Morris Perlmutter (*or Mawlruss Perlmutter)
 George Sidney as Abe Potash
 Vera Gordon as Rosie Potash
 Betty Blythe as Rita Sismondi
 Belle Bennett as Mrs. Perlmutter
 Anders Randolf as Blanchard
 Peggy Shaw as Irma Potash
 Charles Meredith as Sam Pemberton
 Lillian Hackett as Miss O'Ryan
 David Butler as Crabbe
 Sidney Franklin as Film Buyer 
 Joseph W. Girard as Film Buyer
 Louis Payne as Banker
 Cyril Ring as Partington
 Norma Talmadge as herself
 Constance Talmadge as herself

References

External links 
 
allmovie/synopsis
 
advert

1924 films
American black-and-white films
American silent feature films
1920s English-language films
Films directed by Alfred E. Green
Samuel Goldwyn Productions films
First National Pictures films
Silent American comedy films
1924 comedy films
1920s American films